Richie Barnett (born ) is a Jamaica international rugby league footballer who has played in the 2000s and 2010s.

Barnett had the best average gain per carry in the Warrington Wolves squad in 2006.

His early days were spent playing semi-professionally at Gateshead Thunder, while he was also studying business computing at Leeds Metropolitan University. He was a key player for Leeds Metropolitan University, leading them to numerous cup and league triumphs. He was top scorer for two out of the three years he was at the university. While still at university Barnett represented Great Britain students which paved the way for Gateshead Thunder to take him on.

Barnett was sold to Hull F.C. in 2004 who paid an appearance-linked deal worth £15,000. He proved his worth by scoring 23 tries in just 25 starts, making him one of Super League's top scorers. Along the way he also picked up a Challenge Cup winners medal with Hull. He joined Warrington Wolves in 2005 and became one of the most consistent try scorers for the club.

Barnett joined Salford City Reds in July 2007.

In March 2008, Barnett received a two-year ban from rugby league after testing positive for epitestosterone in a drugs test the previous year. He signed for Sheffield Eagles when returning to the game in 2010.

In 2011, Barnett represented Jamaica in the 2013 Rugby League World Cup Qualifiers, where the Jamaicans took on the USA and South Africa. In 2015, Barnett played for Jamaica in their 2017 Rugby League World Cup qualifiers.

He is occasionally known as Richie Barnett Jr because he used to play with an older un-related rugby league footballer, also named Richie Barnett.

References

External links
(archived by web.archive.org) Stats → PastPlayers → B at hullfc.com
(archived by web.archive.org) Statistics at hullfc.com
(archived by web.archive.org) Richie Barnett Doncaster player profile
(archived by web.archive.org) Richie Barnett ready for Super League test

1981 births
Living people
Doncaster R.L.F.C. players
Doping cases in rugby league
English sportspeople of Jamaican descent
English rugby league players
Hull F.C. players
Hunslet R.L.F.C. players
Jamaica national rugby league team players
Jamaican rugby league players
Keighley Cougars players
Newcastle Thunder players
Rugby league wingers
Salford Red Devils players
Sheffield Eagles players
Warrington Wolves players
Widnes Vikings players